Michael Kane Bankston (March 12, 1970) is a former defensive tackle and defensive end who played nine seasons in the National Football League (NFL). Bankston played for the Phoenix/Arizona Cardinals and Cincinnati Bengals. He played college football at Sam Houston State University.

References

1970 births
Living people
American football defensive ends
American football defensive tackles
Arizona Cardinals players
Cincinnati Bengals players
Phoenix Cardinals players
Sam Houston Bearkats football players
People from Wharton County, Texas
Players of American football from Texas